The National Association of Students of Architecture (NASA, India) is an architectural student association with over 300+ associated colleges all over India and around the world. NASA India's primary objective is to establish a platform for architecture students to learn and engage, directly and indirectly, through both online and offline resources. NASA India conducts Programs, events, conventions, seminars, workshops & trophies, and several other activities that aim to enhance the holistic development of students. NASA, India is an autonomous, non-profitable, non-political, non-religious, and democratic body for the undergraduate students of Architecture in India. NASA, India is a non-profit and non-political association registered under the Societies Act 1860 vides no. 24786 as applicable to the National Capital Territory of New Delhi, India. NASA India has its headquarters currently located at the Department of Architecture, School of Planning and Architecture, New Delhi.

Aims and objectives 
At NASA, India we believe that architects can come together, learn and create a huge positive impact on the world, and strive for the same through our activities. Millions of students have gone through the NASA India experience in its rich history since its foundation in 1957. Today, NASA, India along with providing students enriched learning experience; it is also connecting students across the country and staging the voice of the student community. The association aims to provide a platform for learning and interactions for students across the country with varied cultural backgrounds.

History 
With the rise of a revolutionising educational system in Independent India, communities across the country emerged to foster the spirit of learning and growth. It was during this period, when a group of students from pioneering colleges of architectural education in India encountered each other, sparking an interaction which in the coming years grew into the establishment of a platform for architecture students to create a collaborative learning environment and facilitate exchange of ideas, discussions and co learning. 

In the year 1957, with a humble number of students, few of which include Mr. D’ Costa and Daji Banaji from Sir JJ School of Architecture, Mumbai, along with the faculty members from the seven founding colleges, marked the inception of what is now the largest architectural students’ association in the world. There was a vision to bring together remarkable individuals, in the field of architecture, with one accord, the thought of organising an event occurred to them. They were optimistic students in charge of carrying out the function, now known as the Annual NASA Convention. The function featured a student work display, a cultural programme, and the distribution of memorabilia.
Those seven colleges, namely:
 School of Planning and Architecture, Delhi (present headquarters of NASA India)
 Indian Institute of Engineering, Science And Technology, Shibpur (formerly Bengal Engineering and Science University, Shibpur)
 Indian Institute of Technology Roorkee
 Indian Institute of Technology Kharagpur
 L S Raheja School of Architecture, Mumbai, (formerly Bandra School of Arts)
 Sir J. J. College of Architecture, Mumbai
 Jawaharlal Nehru Architecture and Fine Arts University Hyderabad (formerly College of Fine Arts and Architecture, JNTU, Hyderabad)

65 years of NASA India 
2022 marks 65 years of the association. From 7 colleges participating in an exhibition, where NASA India started as a movement to an association with more than 65000+ students connected, NASA India has grown and prospered for a better good. The association has catered to a diverse crowd with different aspirations though united by the same degree. With time, architecture has extended its branches out to varied fields and so has NASA India with an ongoing effort providing workshops, programs and trophies in allied fields of architecture.

Structure

Leadership 
Leadership in the National Association of Students of Architecture (NASA) in India is critical to the association's smooth operation and growth. NASA is a non-profit organisation dedicated to promoting architectural education and awareness among Indian students. NASA's leadership is responsible for setting the organization's direction and goals, as well as ensuring that these goals are met through effective planning and execution.

The leadership of NASA is typically made up of a group of student leaders who are chosen through an election process. They are known as council members, and they are in charge of various aspects of the association, such as finances, events, and communication. They collaborate to make decisions and set the organization's course, while also communicating with the general council to keep them informed and engaged.

Effective leadership at NASA India necessitates a wide range of qualities, including excellent communication, organisational, and decision-making capabilities. Members of the council must be able to work well as a team and establish a positive tone for the association by leading by example. They must also be able to inspire and motivate others to get involved and take action in order to attain NASA India's goals.

Overall, leadership in NASA plays a vital role in shaping the organization and ensuring that it is able to meet its objectives, while also engaging and empowering the students of architecture in India.

Council 
The council of NASA India comprises Executive Council, Zonal Council and Unit Council, altogether make up the General Council. The NASA Executive and Zonal Council is composed of students who get chosen by the Unit Council to the association's highest office for a one-year term. The roles and responsibilities of each post are detailed out in the NASA India Constitution.

Executive Council 
The Executive Council establishes and adopts the rules and regulations to supplement the provisions of this Constitution, including but not limited to the Operating Guidelines and Policies. The posts in executive council are:

 National President
 National Secretary
 National Vice President
 National Treasurer
 Programs Head
 Events Head
 National Advisor

Zonal Council 
The Zonal Council overlook their respective zones and ensure smooth functioning of the same. Each zone elects a Zonal President from the passing out batch of Unit Secretaries. Currently, there are six Zonal Presidents as there are six zones.

Zones 
Members of the association hail from several Indian states. NASA India now has over 300 affiliated colleges and over 65,000 architectural students under its umbrella. The zones are divided into six geographical areas.

Unit Council 
The Unit Council shall consist of the Unit Secretary and the Unit Designee who shall be the official representatives appointed by the unit. Their primary responsibility is to look after the proceedings with respect to NASA India in their unit/ college and ensure passage of communication from the association to the students of their unit.

Collaborations 
NASA India is constantly striving to find mutually beneficial ways to work with other organizations and external entities, whose vision and objectives are in line with the Association’s, to put its network and resources into relevant use. Since it is believed that collaboration is the key to success, and we are always looking for ways to collaborate with other organizations in order to promote the development of the students pursuing architecture.

Current collaborations 
NASA India is currently associated with many institutions across the world:

 INTACH
 Centre for the Living City
 Housing and Urban Development Corporation of India (HUDCO)
 Indian Society of Landscape Architects (ISOLA) IFLA
 Laurie Baker Centre for Habitat Studies
 GRIHA
 Ethos India
 EASA

Past collaborations 
NASA India’s previous collaborations are:

 International Council on Monuments and Sites (ICOMOS)
 Indian Heritage Cities Network – UNESCO or IHCN-UNESCO
 Association of Designers of India (ADI)
 Virasat Foundation
 Indian Institute of Photography
 University of Westminster
 ArchiDesign Awards

Trophies 
Trophies focus on encouraging students to explore different aspects of architectural design and creativity. These are open to all architecture students belonging to colleges associated with NASA India and typically consists of several categories under architectural design, urban design, sustainable design, and research-based projects. Trophies aim at motivating students to think critically and creatively about architecture, and to develop their design skills.

Group A

Annual NASA Design Competition Trophy 
Annual NASA Design Competition Trophy is a design based competition. The design briefs are based on providing sustainable solutions and innovative designs for the community. The winners are awarded at the Annual NASA convention.

GRIHA Trophy 
In yet another fresh demonstration of our  commitment to sustainable urban development, the  NASA India - GRIHA trophy is initiated in 2013 awarded by The Association for Development and  Research of Sustainable Habitats (ADaRSH) under the  aegis of The Energy and Resources Institute (TERI) and  the Ministry of New and Renewable Energy,  Government of India, in partnership with National  Association of Students of Architecture (NASA). 

The shortlisted entries get to present the work at the Annual Summit of GRIHA. The winners get to go for the case studies of green  rated buildings across the country with the GRIHA  members.

HUDCO Trophy 
This trophy is a collaborative initiative of NASA India and HUDCO. The trophy is sponsored by the Housing and Urban Development Corporation Limited (HUDCO).

This trophy aims at designing for the informal sector and gives design alternatives for the issues pertaining to the solutions to Sustainable Urban Development. Since 1993, HUDCO is hosting design competition through National Association of Students of Architecture (NASA, India) every year.

Louis I Kahn Trophy 
Louis I Kahn Trophy was started to promote the awareness about architectural  heritage and human settlement planning among  the masses, Louis l Kahn trophy takes this idea  forward. The work is documented and published by NASA India.

The work could be used more effectively if documentation work is verified /archived in  conjunction with ASI, Central Urban development  and Tourism Ministry, Central HRD. The Ministry,  ICOMOS charter, UNESCO concerns and various  Heritage societies like INTACH Conservation and revitalisation measures can be suggested and carried out for the projects.

GSEN Trophy 
Named after Mr. Gopal Sen, an eminent architect, the aim of GSEN Trophy revolves around on site studies of successful design projects and translating the results into practice.

The trophy is awarded to the best study and  redesign of existing inadequate projects, which  combines the thoughts of the clients, users and the  architects. This trophy involves documentation, analysis and  redesign with an integrated approach to the  design process. It aims to understand and appreciate the existing  built form of a building and redesign on that basis  satisfying a given theme.

Group B

Mohammad Shaheer Landscape Trophy 
Mohammad Shaheer Landscape Trophy (Indian Society Of  Landscape Architects) for setting up design briefs and its  jury. The trophy intends to consider all the questions affecting  and relating to the landscape architecture / landscape  design. The aim of the trophy is to acquaint students to learn different styles of landscape architecture as well as its importance in architecture. It also aims to open up avenues to explore one more  direction of the practice of the profession, when students embark in their own careers.

Lauri Baker Trophy 
Started in 2012, this is  a collaborative initiative of NASA INDIA and  Laurie Baker Centre for Habitat Studies, Trivandrum. This trophy gives attention towards the cost effective  building techniques, materials and execution of the  same. The winning entry is executed on site with  modifications by the working professionals at Laurie Baker Centre. This is also linked with the NASA – LBC Exposure Program, which is a series of workshops held at LBC to  educate students the techniques of cost effective  architecture along with the practical experience of  hands on site.

Writing Architecture Trophy 
The Writing Architecture aims to promote architectural journalism. Thereby the students are required to submit an article/ essay pertaining to the brief on their findings and  research on that topic. The brief is based on the latest architectural issues. The winning entries are awarded and are published in NASA’s Indian Arch magazine.

Earlier, Writing Architecture Trophy was known as Akar Trophy for Architectural Journalism (ATAJ) which primarily aimed to inculcate the intrinsic observation capabilities of students to be aware of the real world around them, and make propositions and express their thoughts in the form of written matter

Industrial Design Trophy 
The trophy aims at exploring product design solutions for various purposes, which could be social or for local masses.

Ethos Trophy 
The Ethos Trophy focuses on individual ethos, sensitivities and value systems, aiming to condition architecture students as individuals of the future, contributing to a constructive society. It is a platform that celebrates academic work of the students and recognizes the star in the making. The trophy strives to identify outstanding students from each year of study, who balance academic excellence with a versatility that benefits his/her evolving role in the journey towards becoming a well rounded contributor to the society.

C P Kukreja Trophy 
The trophy is a joint venture between the National Association of Students of Architecture, India and the C P Kukreja Foundation. More relevant, regimented and intriguing briefs catering to students across all the semesters.

Le Corbusier Trophy 
The Le Corbusier trophy is the highest award a college or an institution can win at NASA, India. The trophy is awarded to the college with the best overall performance across all the trophies conducted by NASA, India in the particular year. The college receives a rolling trophy and with three consecutive wins, the trophy is given to the college.

Past Trophies 
Past trophies include Unknown Crafts Person Trophy (UCP Trophy), Nari Gandhi Trophy, Destech Trophy among others. UCP trophy aimed to provide opportunity to students of architecture, for explorations in a lesser known but highly significant wealth of knowledge and wisdom embodied in the construction traditions of India and its regions, and to encourage them to develop a deeper and more holistic understanding of processes and human skills connected with traditional construction in all regions of the country. The Nari Gandhi Trophy intends to examine the NASA theme of parallel projections through the deeper relationships between architecture and culture. Destech Trophy was unique design competition that brings together creative thinking and digital advancements in the built environment sector. It challenges creative thinkers to explore opportunities within Smart City systems, processes and engagement strategies. The challenge encourages participants to collaborate with fast emerging digital sectors as well as local citizens to bring forward innovative ideas. NASA India set itself apart from conventional design competitions by providing mentoring and research inputs from international experts to bring the best out of the participants.

Programs 
NASA India conducts programs by experts in the field of architecture from all across India based in different parts of the country. These programs provide students with a comprehensive education and knowledge in the field of architecture along with providing students hands on experiential learning opportunities.

OAN Grants Program 
OAN Grants Program aims to invite and involve students who are extremely passionate about transforming their cities and towns to bring about a change in the society and its built environment.  Each of the winning individuals or teams are awarded with upto Rs. 1,25,000 per proposal to implement their proposal on site and realise their project idea. 

So far, grants worth R.s 9,00,000 have been awarded to 8 projects that spanned over two cycles which received over 300 registrations.

Summer/Winter School Program 
Summer/Winter School Programs are conducted with an aim to provide a unique and one of a kind learning experience for architecture students in various domains in and around architecture. With over 1000+ Participants from an overwhelming number of 3000+ registrations so far, each program consisted of various courses by expert tutors covering a specific topic conveyed over a few days.

EASA 
The European Architecture Students Assembly has various students attending their annual event and participate in workshops, displays, talks, and group activities that are loosely centred on a single subject. These activities are planned by a group of academics and students and include a wide range of activities that have some connection to architecture. EASA has been a sister organisation of NASA India and has held a proactive interaction.

Events

Conventions 
NASA India hosts multiple conventions of varied scale and locations. It consists of a wide range of interesting keynote speeches, seminars, workshops, events, and cultural performances, among other things. It is a fantastic platform for networking and a platform for students to learn about all facets of architecture and related areas, supporting overall growth of a student.

Annual NASA Convention (ANC) 
The flagship National Scale event, Annual NASA Convention is held annually once hosted by one of 300+ associated colleges. It is a three to five day event held at the end of every tenure, with 3000-6000 students attending across the nation.

Zonal NASA Convention (ZNC) 
Each zone hosts their own zonal level event happening across the year, with all the colleges across the zone. It is a three day event with a footfall of 1500+ students across the zone. It promotes more regional architectural practices and architects for the exposure of students.

NASA Day 
NASA India was established in 1957 and registered with the Societies Act on the 13th of September 1993. The 13th of September every year is celebrated as the NASA India Founding Day. During NASA day, giving back to society is something we have been practising throughout the years. Various events, charities, social and welfare programs are held throughout the month in various places and platforms.

Publications

Indian Arch 
Indian Arch is the annual magazine under the NASA banner that includes works and writings of revolutionary architects associated with India. It is a platform for students to contribute their best works according to the yearly theme. It also gives a glimpse of year long activities of NASA India that include zonal conventions, panel discussions, NASA Day activities (celebrated on 13th September every year), heritage walks  et cetera.

Trophy books 
Trophy books comprise the winning entries of various trophies of NASA India. The aim is to acknowledge and appreciate the hard work of the students of colleges that are recipients of Citation and Special Mention. It also acts like a knowledge bank of the trophies to all the other participating colleges and to the student fraternity as a whole.

Branding

NASA logo 
The NASA India Logo is the primary identifier of the association. It portrays our core values of who we are and what we stand for. The logo consists of three main elements:

The Arch- The strongest of structural elements, symbolises the association’s strength, the students.

The Doorway- Welcoming everyone, the doorway opens for everyone. 

The Sanctum-The whole world of creativity, innovation and support in students, for students.

The logo was registered in the year 2018.

External logo 
The external NASA India Logo comprises the three main elements along with the association’s name. It is used for

 Collaborations
 External Communication
 Social Media Post
 Outreach Content
 Certificates
 Letterheads
 Publications
 Visiting Cards

Internal logo 
The internal NASA India Logo comprises the three main elements. It is used for:

 Sheets
 Reports
 Submissions
 Unit Secretary Certificates 
 Minutes of meeting
 ID Cards
 Council Badges
 Trophies
 Constitution
 Other Legal Documents

Logo usage

With white background 
For logos which are to be printed/ stuck/ glued on materials like:

 Paper 
 Acrylic
 Canvas
 Plastic
 Glass

Without white background 
For logos which are to be etched/ engraved/ embossed/ inlaid/ sculpted/ carved/embroidered/ woven on materials like:

 Wood
 Metal
 Jute
 Fabric
 Ceramics

65th year's council

Executive Council 
National President: Tarun Krishna
National Secretary: Chaitanya Gajbhiye
National Vice President: Neeraj Kumar
National Treasurer: Abdus Samad
Programs Head: Divyansh Gupta
Events Head: Hari Sasikumar
Advisor: Manogna Malempati

Zonal Council 
Zonal President, Zone 1: Muskan Goyal
Zonal President, Zone 2: Nikhil Ahir
Zonal President, Zone 3: Arushi Ponnala
Zonal President, Zone 4: Sharanya Chitrala
Zonal President, Zone 5:  Ajay Betageri
Zonal President, Zone 6: Navaneeth Krishna

References

External links
NASA India official website
40th Annual NASA Convention

Student organisations in India